Selamat Sultan is the state anthem of Kelantan, Malaysia. Its melody was composed on 5 July 1927 by Allahyarham Mohamed bin Hamzah Saaid (1895–1971), the Goa-born Bandmaster of the Kelantan Police Band who was ordered to have an instrumental song played for the then-Sultan of Kelantan, Ismail. Subsequently, the words were composed by Mahmood bin Hamzah (1893–1971), who was the State Secretary at that time.

Lyrics

References

Notes

External links
 Kelantan state anthem at national-anthems.org

Kelantan
Anthems of Malaysia